Kuttikkanam, is a hill station in Idukki district, Kerala, southern India. It is within the territory of Peermade. Kanjirappally and Mundakayam are the nearest towns.

History

In the 16th century the territory was under the rule of Changanacherry kings and was uninhabited. In 1756, the King of Travancore conquered Changanacherry, and brought the place under his supremacy. A Church Mission Society missionary, Henry Baker, started coffee plantations, and under the regency of Sri Moolam Thirunal these became tea plantations.

Under the British Raj in India, Kuttikkanam became an up-market resort. Since at first there was no road but only a pathway, the British started the Aerial Ropeway Ltd, Travancore state's first public limited company. 
The summer palace of the Travancore kings was located in Kuttikkanam.

During the British period and after, manpower was brought to Kuttikkanam from various parts of Kerala and Tamil Nadu. The descendants of these migrant workers constitute the major part of the population of Kuttikkanam.

Surroundings
Peeru Hills. About 1 km distance.
Grampi.
Thottapura. The place where the Travancore royal family stored weapons.
Baker Hills (Commercially Named To Thrisangu Hills), Rolling hills with views.
Panchalimedu, a viewpoint, according to legend one of the many hiding places of the Pandavas and Panchali. From a pond known as Panchalikkulam the "Makarajyothi", can be seen, the divine flame lit during the pilgrimage season in Sabarimala.
Valanjanganam falls. A main attraction of Kuttikkanam, also known as Ninnumullippara.
Nallathanni viewpoint. On the Kottayam-Kumily National Highway.
Artificial forest. A dense pine forest covering . Contains an estimated 30 species of birds, including rare endangered species. It is classified as a buffer zone by the Department of Forests and Wildlife, Kerala.
Azhutha Diversion Project. A project constructed by the Kerala government on the Azhutha river, diverting water to Idukki Reservoir through a 987 m long tunnel.

Atrractions
Josh Shiju John

Educational Institutions
Marian International Institute of Management
 Marian College Kuttikkanam
 Mar Baselios Christian College of Engineering and Technology, Kuttikanam
 IHRD College Kuttikkanam
 St. Pius X English School Kuttikanam
 St. Joseph's Malayalam Lower Primary School, Kuttikanam
 Government Model Residential School (GMRS), Kuttikanam
 Sahyadri Institute of Ayurveda Nursing & Panchakarma
 Mariagiri English Medium Higher Secondary School, Kuttikanam

Gallery

References

Books
 The Story of Peermade by George Thengummoottil http://www.theindia.info/Peermade/

External links

 Idukki Photo album
 About Kuttikkanam
 Kuttikkanam resort
 
Populated places in the Western Ghats
Hill stations in Kerala
Villages in Idukki district
Kuttikkanam